Charles Magnusson (26 January 1878 – 18 January 1948) was a Swedish film producer and screenwriter.

Career 
In 1894, Magnusson's job was a professional photographer in Sweden and in 1905 he changed careers to be newsreel camera operator. By 1907, Magnusson found the Swedish Cinematographic Society. He was then hired in 1909 by Svenska Biografteatern, the first Swedish studio, as a general manager. The first film he was part of was released in 1909 by the name Varmlanningarne. Svenska Biografteatern was originally in Kristianstad until 1911 when they moved to Stockholm. Under Svenska Biografteatern, Magnusson hired Victor Sjostrom and Mauritz Stiller as directors in 1912. After, Magnusson was promoted to production chief in 1919 and remained in that position until 1928 when he retired.

Produced films 

 Varmlanningarne - 1909
 Spiskroksvalen - 1909
 Sjorovaren - 1909
 Fiskarvals fran Bohuslan - 1909
 Nar jag var Prins Utav Arkadien - 1909
 Nattmarschen i Sankt Eriks Grand - 1909
 Minnen fran Bostonklubben (Memories from the Boston Club) - 1909
 Brollopet pa Ulfasa - 1909
 Fanrik Stals Sagner - 1909
 Faderulla - 1910
 ur Goteborgssystemet I - 1910
 Pick Me Up, ur Flickorna Jackson - 1910
 Nu gar jag till Maxim - 1910
 Entres angen, ur Dollarprinsessan - 1910
 Urfeus i underjjorden (Orpheus in the Underworld) - 1910
 Jarnbararen (Iron Carrier) - 1911
 Sjomansdansen - 1911
 Amuletten (The Talisman) - 1911
 Det grona halsbandet (The Green Necklace) - 1912
 Samhallets dom (The Justice of Society) -1912
 Kolingens galoscher - 1912
 Tva Svenska emigranters aventyr i Amerika (The Adventures of Two Swedish Emigrants in America) - 1912
 Branningar, eller Stulen lycka - 1912
 De svarta maskerna (The Black Masks) - 1912
 Dodshoppet farn circkuskupolen -1912
 Mor och dotter (Mother and Daughter) - 1912
 Tradgardsmastaren (The Gardener) - 1912
 Ett hemligt giftermal (A Secret Marriage) - 1912
 I livets var, eller Forsta alskarinnan (In the Spring of Life, or His First Love) - 1912
 Den tryanniske fastmannen (The Tyrannical Fiancee) - 1912
 Skandalen (Scandal) - 1912
 Vampyren (Vampire) - 1912
 En sommarsaga (A Summer Tale) - 1912
 Barnet (The Child) - 1912
 Lojen och tarar (Ridicule and Tears) - 1913
 Nar karleken dodar (When Love Kills) - 1913
 Lady Marions sommarflirt (Lady Marion's Summer Flirtation) - 1913
 Ingeborg Holm (Give Us This Day) - 1913
 Gransfolken (The Border Feud)  - 1913
 Miraklet (The Miracle) - 1913
 Halvblod (Halfbreed) - 1913
 Prasten (The Priest) - 1914
 Strejken (Strike) - 1914
 Stormfageln (The Stormy Petrel) - 1914
 Gatans barn (Children of the Street) - 1914
 Det roda tornet (The Master) - 1914
 Hogfjallets dotter(Daughter of the Mountains) - 1914
 Madame de Thebes - 1915
 Hans brollopsnatt (His Wedding Night) - 1915
 Rosen pa Tistelon (The Rose of Thistle Island) - 1916
 Karlek och journalistik (Love and the Journalist) - 1916
 Vingarna (The Wings) - 1916
 Therese - 1916
 Den levande mumien (The Living Mummy) - 1916
 Vem Skot (Tallroth) - 1916
 Balettprimadonnan (Anjuta, the Dancer) - 1916
 Terje vigen (A Man There Was) - 1917
 Thomas Graals basta film (Thomas Graal's Best Picture) - 1917
 Tosen fran stormyrtorpet (The Lass from the Stormy Croft) - 1918
 Berg-Ejvind och hans hustru (The Outlaw and His Wife) - 1918
 Thomas Graals basta barn (Thomas Graal's Best Child) - 1918
 Sangen om den eldroda blomman (Song of the Scarlet Flower) - 1918
 Ingmarssonerna (Sons of Ingmar) - 1919
 Dunungen (The Downey Girl) - 1919
 Herr Arnes pengar (Sir Arne's Treasure) - 1919
 Hans nads testamente (The Will of His Grace) - 1919
 Fiskebyn (The Fishing Village) - 1919
 Klostret it sendomir (The Monastery of Sendomir) - 1920
 Karin Ingmarsdotter (Karin, Daughter of Ingmar) -1920
 Masterman (Master Samuel) - 1920
 Prastankan (The Parson's Widow) - 1920
 Guyrkoviscarna - 1920
 Familijens traditioner - 1920
 Carollina Rediviva - 1920
 Erotikon - 1920
 Johan - 1920
 Korkarlen (The Phantom Chariot) - 1921
 Vallfarten till Kevlar (Pilgrimage to Kevlar) - 1921
 Kvarnen - 1921
 Hogre andamal - 1921
 De landsflyktiga (The Exiles) - 1921
 En vildfagel - 1921
 Vem domer (Love's Crucible) - 1922
 Det omrigade huset (The Surrounded House) - 1922
 Gunnar Hedes Saga (Gunnar Hede's Saga) - 1922
 Eld ombord (The Tragic Ship) - 1923
 Harda viljor - 1923
 Johan Ulfstjerna - 1923
 Malarpirater (Pirates on Lake Malar) - 1923
 Karusellen - 1923
 Boman pa utstallningen - 1923
 Gosta Berlings Saga (Gosta Berling's Saga) - 1923
 En piga blad pigor - 1924
 Ingmarsarvet (The Ingmar Inheritance) - 1925
 Till Osterland (To the Orient) - 1926

Selected filmography
 Laughter and Tears (1913)
 The Lass from the Stormy Croft (1917)
 Terje Vigen (1917)
 The Outlaw and His Wife (1918)
 Sons of Ingmar (1919)
 His Lordship's Last Will (1919)
 The Phantom Carriage (1921)
 The Blizzard (1923)

References

External links

1878 births
1948 deaths
Swedish film producers
Swedish male screenwriters
People from Gothenburg
20th-century Swedish screenwriters
20th-century Swedish male writers